Charles Johnson(December 19, 1961 - ) is  the former Head coach of the Saitama Broncos in the Japanese Bj League.

Head coaching record

|-
| style="text-align:left;"|Saitama Broncos
| style="text-align:left;"|2005-06
| 40||7||33|||| style="text-align:center;"|6th|||-||-||-||
| style="text-align:center;"|-
|- 
| style="text-align:left;"|Toyama Grouses
| style="text-align:left;"|2009-10
| 52||17||35|||| style="text-align:center;"|6th in Eastern|||-||-||-||
| style="text-align:center;"|-
|-

References

1964 births
Living people
American expatriate basketball people in Japan
American men's basketball players
Basketball coaches from Texas
Basketball players from Texas
Midland Chaps basketball players
People from Midland, Texas
Saitama Broncos coaches
Saitama Broncos players
Texas Tech Red Raiders basketball players
Toyama Grouses coaches